Cappadocian language may refer to:

 Ancient Cappadocian language, an Indo-European language of the Anatolian group spoken in ancient Asia Minor
 Cappadocian Greek, the Greek dialect spoken in Cappadocia until 1923.